Clyde Frederick Shannon Jr. (born 1942) is a former United States district judge of the United States District Court for the Western District of Texas.

Education and career

Born in Marshall, Texas, Shannon received a Bachelor of Business Administration from Loyola University New Orleans in 1965 and a Bachelor of Laws from the University of Texas School of Law in 1968. He was in private practice in San Antonio, Texas from 1968 to 1975. He was a judge of the 131st District Court of Texas from 1975 to 1980.

Federal judicial service

Shannon was nominated by President Jimmy Carter on December 19, 1979, to a seat on the United States District Court for the Western District of Texas vacated by Judge Dorwin Wallace Suttle. He was confirmed by the United States Senate on June 18, 1980, and received his commission the same day. Shannon served until his resignation on January 1, 1984.

Post judicial service

Shannon returned to the private practice of law in San Antonio following his resignation from the federal bench.

References

Sources
 

1942 births
Living people
Judges of the United States District Court for the Western District of Texas
Loyola University New Orleans alumni
People from Marshall, Texas
United States district court judges appointed by Jimmy Carter
20th-century American judges
University of Texas School of Law alumni